The Horseman is a 2008 Australian vigilante action film directed and written by Steven Kastrissios and starring Peter Marshall, Evert McQueen and introducing Caroline Marohasy.

Plot
After the drug-induced death of his teenaged daughter, Christian (Peter Marshall) is sent a video tape, a "snuff film" involving his  daughter and several men. Christian then decides to avenge his daughter by killing all those linked to the sex tape. Along the way he meets a teenage runaway named Alice (Caroline Marohasy) and a fragile friendship begins to unfold.

Cast

Production
The Horseman was conceived as a short film.

Release
The film came out on DVD and Blu-ray on 1 March 2010 in the UK. The film was part of the Sitges Film Festival, Fantasia Festival, the Film4 FrightFest and South by Southwest 2009. Screen Media Ventures set the limited theatrical run for the United States on 15 June 2010.

Critical reception
While it has been criticised for the brutal violence and content matter, receiving an R rating, writer and director Steven Kastrissios has mentioned he believes that the brutality is essential to the story. It currently has a rating of 60% on the movie review site Rotten Tomatoes based on 30 reviews, with an average score of 5.9/10.

Accolades

References

External links

Official Site

2008 films
2008 horror films
2008 thriller drama films
2008 psychological thriller films
Australian drama films
Australian thriller films
Australian vigilante films
Rape and revenge films
Films set in Queensland
Films shot in Queensland
2008 drama films
2000s English-language films
2000s vigilante films